Sanjeev T (born as Sanjeev Philip Thomas on September 8, 1980) is an Indian music producer, composer, singer, guitarist, and performer. Sanjeev’s music is an amalgamation of indie, rock, reggae, fusion, and jazz sounds. Currently, he is an independent music producer and also the founder and chief mentor at Rainbow Bridge, a music school and production studio in Bangalore. He is most known for his work as a lead guitarist with A.R. Rahman (2005 – 2015) and played for movies like Rockstar, Delhi-6, Vinnaithandi Varuvaya, Jaane Tu Ya Jaane Na, Blue, Endhiran and more. He also worked with Bollywood music directors Pritam and Anu Malik and other Indian music directors like Shaan Rahman, Ghibran and Leon James. He has also composed music for two Malayalam movies, Vilakkumaram (2017) and Manoharam (2019). Apart from his work in the movie industry, he has officially released three albums, Freewill (2012), Epic Shit (2013) and St. (2018) with the fourth album, Future, scheduled for release by 2021. Four singles from his next album, Future, have already been released.

Sanjeev has played and worked with musicians in India and globally including John Beasley, Taku Hirano, Oscar Seaton, Sivamani, Hariharan, Leslie Lewis, Sid Sriram and Rabbi Shergil.

Sanjeev is endorsed by Gibson Guitars (USA), Laney Amps (USA), Faith Guitars (UK) and D’Addario (US).

Early life 
Sanjeev was born and raised in Kuwait and completed his schooling from Carmel Convent. He subsequently attended Alpha College, Chennai and then graduated with a degree in Bachelor of Commerce (2001) from Madras University, Chennai. He is currently based in Bangalore and operates out of both Bangalore and Chennai.

Career 
Sanjeev’s musical journey began at an early age, and owing to a supportive family he was able to pursue his passion and began singing and playing the guitar when he was eight. His college years were instrumental in his decision to take up music as a career and after his graduation, he founded and performed with bands, Buddha’s Babies and Buddha Blown in Chennai. In 2004, Sanjeev established Rainbow Bridge in Chennai, a music production studio, to further his love for music and his passion to contribute to the music scene in India. In 2005, Sanjeev joined A.R. Rahman as a lead guitarist and toured with him across the globe for the next decade, working on many blockbusters with the Oscar and Grammy winning maestro. During this time, he also released two albums of his own, Freewill (2012) and Epic Shit (2013). Sanjeev also founded and led bands Rainbow Bridge (2005-2015), Kashmir with Baiju Dharmajan, and his collaborative act The Sanjeev T Collective has featured musicians like Naresh Iyer, Grammy winner Dr. Prakash Sontakke, and Baiju Dharmajan.

Springr 
From 2012 to 2014, Sanjeev was involved with independent music platform and record label Springr in Kochi, Kerala. His album, Epic Shit was originally released under the Springr record label.

Rainbow Bridge 
Rainbow Bridge was originally set up in Chennai as a studio by Sanjeev in 2004, but he also toured and performed with a band under the same name, featuring artists Benny Dayal, Keba Jeramiah, and Jeremaya Abraham John between 2005 and 2015. Soon after, he set up Rainbow Bridge in Bangalore in 2015 as a music school, production studio, and jam pad, which currently has more than 150 students and a dedicated crew of 15 musicians. Through Rainbow Bridge, Sanjeev has also collaborated with indie musicians like Brodha V, Gowry Lekshmi and Gubbi.

Awards 
Sanjeev was one of the five individuals nominated by the British Council of India in 2009 for the Young Entrepreneur in Music Award for his work with Rainbow Bridge. He was also named the Most Inventive, Innovative and Creative Indie Act in Asia at the prestigious AVIMA Awards in 2010 and also received an award in the Best Genre-bending Music category at the Indiego Awards in 2012 for his album Freewill. His album Epic Shit won Best Guitarist and Best Vocalist at the Jack Daniel’s & Rolling Stone Music Awards in 2013. Sanjeev was one of the first artists to be featured in MTV Unplugged and in the MTV Coke Studio series. His EP, St., was nominated at the 17th Independent Music Awards (IMA) in New York in 2019, under both world and instrumental categories.

Discography

Guitarist

Singer

Music Composer/ Background Score

Independent Releases

References 

1980 births
Indian guitarists
Living people
21st-century guitarists